Kooy is a surname. Notable people with the surname include:

Chris Kooy (1982–2020), Canadian soccer player
Dick Kooy (born 1987), Dutch-born Italian volleyball player
Manfred Kooy (born 1970), Dutch Paralympian athlete 
Peter Kooy (born 1954), Dutch bass singer

See also
Koos (name)